Zhang Li (born October 4, 1976 in Beijing) is a female Chinese handball player who competed in the 1996 Summer Olympics and in the 2004 Summer Olympics.

In 1996 she finished fifth with the Chinese team in the women's competition. She played all four matches and scored nine goals.

Eight years later she was a member of the Chinese team which finished eighth in the women's competition. She played six matches and scored ten goals.

References

1976 births
Living people
Chinese female handball players
Handball players at the 1996 Summer Olympics
Handball players at the 2004 Summer Olympics
Olympic handball players of China
Sportspeople from Beijing